Dortmund II is an electoral constituency (German: Wahlkreis) represented in the Bundestag. It elects one member via first-past-the-post voting. Under the current constituency numbering system, it is designated as constituency 143. It is located in the Ruhr region of North Rhine-Westphalia, comprising the eastern part of the city of Dortmund.

Dortmund II was created for the inaugural 1949 federal election. Since 2013, it has been represented by Sabine Poschmann of the Social Democratic Party (SPD).

Geography
Dortmund II is located in the Ruhr region of North Rhine-Westphalia. As of the 2021 federal election, it comprises the Stadtbezirke of 1 Eving, 2 Scharnhorst, 3 Brackel, 4 Aplerbeck, and 5 Hörde and the Stadtteil of Innenstadt-Nord from 0 Innenstadt.

History
Dortmund II was created in 1949. In the 1949 election, it was North Rhine-Westphalia constituency 57 in the numbering system. From 1953 through 1961, it was number 116. From 1965 through 1976, it was number 115. From 1980 through 1998, it was number 114. From 2002 through 2009, it was number 144. Since 2013, it has been number 143.

Originally, the constituency comprised the southern part of the independent city of Dortmund. From 1980 through 1998, it comprised the Stadtbezirke of 1 Eving, 2 Scharnhorst, 3 Brackel, and 9 Mengede, as well as the Stadtteil of Innenstadt-Nord from 0 Innenstadt. It acquired its current borders in the 2002 election.

Members
The constituency has been held continuously by the Social Democratic Party (SPD) since its creation. It was first represented by Dietrich Keuning from 1949 to 1961, when he was succeeded by Willi Beuster until 1969. Friedhelm Dohmann then served a single term. Hans-Eberhard Urbaniak was elected in 1982 and was representative until 1980. Alfred Meininghaus served two terms from 1980 to 1987. Wolfgang Weiermann was then representative from 1987 to 2002. Ulla Burchardt served from 2002 to 2013. Sabine Poschmann was elected in 2013, and re-elected in 2017 and 2021.

Election results

2021 election

2017 election

2013 election

2009 election

References

Federal electoral districts in North Rhine-Westphalia
1949 establishments in West Germany
Constituencies established in 1949
Dortmund